Edward Tuck (August 24, 1842 – April 30, 1938) was an American banker, diplomat, and philanthropist. He is known for funding the establishment of the Tuck School of Business at his alma mater, Dartmouth College. The son of Amos Tuck, a founder of the Republican Party, Edward Tuck served as the Vice Consul in Paris, and grew his fortune as a partner of the banking firm .

Early life
Tuck was born in Exeter, New Hampshire on August 24, 1842.  He was the son of Sarah Ann Nudd (1810–1847) and political figure Amos Tuck (1810–1879).  His half-sister was Ellen Tuck French (1838–1915), who was married to Francis Ormond French, President of the Manhattan Trust Company.

Tuck was educated at Philips Exeter Academy and Dartmouth College, where he roomed with future College president William Jewett Tucker.

Career
He began his career in 1864, he was appointed by U.S. President Abraham Lincoln as the Vice Consul in Paris under U.S. Ambassador John Bigelow.  In the following year, he resigned, shortly before the Franco-Prussian War, and joined the banking firm Munroe & Co., where he was made a partner in 1871.

He retired from banking in 1881, and, in 1889, went to live as an expatriate in France, where he donated an art collection valued at $5 million, and funds for hospitals and other institutions.

Philanthropy
Upon graduating from Dartmouth College, Tuck made a donation of one dollar to the College for "unrestricted use." After his college roommate and longtime friend, William Jewett Tucker, became president of Dartmouth, Edward Tuck became one of Dartmouth's most prolific benefactors. Tuck gave Tuck Drive, an aesthetic bypass and 3,800 ft private highway; the College President's House; the Tuck School, and its grouping of buildings; art works from his private collection; and large cash contributions.  

In 1899, Tuck initially donated $300,000 — in the form of 1,700 shares of preferred stock in the Great Northern Railway Company of Minnesota — to Dartmouth to endow the Amos Tuck School of Administration and Finance, in memory of his father. He then donated another $100,000, in 1901, to build the first Tuck Hall (now McNutt Hall). In 1929, after solicitation from Ernest Martin Hopkins, the 11th President of Dartmouth, Tuck donated 600 shares of Chase National Bank, which was sold for $567,766. His gifts to the Tuck School are estimated at over $18 million as of 2017.

Other recipients of Tuck's philanthropy included two hospitals (including Stell Hospital), a school, the American University Center in Paris, art collections in France, and the restoration of Roman monument, Tropaeum Alpium. In addition, he donated funds to the New Hampshire Historical Society to build its New Hampshire History Building housing the Tuck Library, and donated to his alma mater, Philips Exeter Academy.

Personal life

In 1872, Tuck married Julia Stell of Philadelphia, for whom Stell Hall, the dining hall at Tuck School is named. As a country residence, Tuck lived at Domaine de Vert-Mont and Château de Bois-Préau, near Château de Malmaison and the western bank of the Seine in Rueil-Malmaison.  The home was formerly owned by Empress Joséphine, wife of Napoléon Bonaparte, and Queen mother Maria Christina of the Two Sicilies, widow of King Ferdinand VII of Spain who lived there with her second husband Agustín Fernando Muñoz, Duke of Riánsares, until she sold the home in 1861 to Napoleon III.

Tuck's wife died on November 12, 1929.  He died on April 30, 1938 in Monte Carlo, Monaco.  His funeral was held at the American Cathedral in Paris, and he was buried alongside his wife at the Saint-Germain-en-Laye cemetery.

His estate was valued at $3,514,487 at the time of his death.

Legacy
In 1929, Tuck received the Grand Cross as a promotion in the Legion of Honour, the highest award in the Legion the French Government can bestow. The Tucks were also awarded the Prix de Vertu by the French Academy in 1916, the first Americans to receive the award. In 1932, Tuck was made an honorary citizen of France, the highest honor the government could give.

In Paris, Avenue Edward Tuck runs a short distance between the Petit Palais and the Place de la Concorde, parallel to the Avenue des Champs-Élysées. In La Turbie, France, a street is also named Rue Edward Tuck.

In Rome, the Edward Tuck Museum, on the site of the Tropaeum Alpium, documents the restoration of the monument, of which Tuck funded.

Asteroid 1038 Tuckia is named after him and his wife..

References 
Notes

Sources
1939 Britannica Book of the Year (Chicago: Encyclopædia Britannica, Inc.), p. 673.

External links

 The Papers of the Tuck Family at Dartmouth College Library
 Franklin Brooks Collection on the Life of Edward Tuck at Dartmouth College Library

1842 births
1938 deaths
People from Exeter, New Hampshire
Dartmouth College alumni
Tuck School of Business people
American diplomats
American expatriates in France
American expatriates in Monaco
19th-century American businesspeople
Activists from New Hampshire
Phillips_Exeter_Academy_alumni
Recipients of the Legion of Honour